Annetta Giovanna Gassion (née Maillard; Livorno, 4 August 1895 – Paris, 6 February 1945) was best known as the mother of internationally renowned singer-songwriter and actress Édith Piaf, considered France's national chanteuse. 

Gassion, was professionally billed under stage name Line Marsa; she was a cabaret singer and circus performer, as an equestrian and tightrope artist.

Early life
Born Annetta Giovanna Maillard on 4 August 1895 in Livorno, Italy to French parents who were on tour as part of a travelling circus troupe. Her father, Auguste Eugène Maillard, came from the Loire region of France. Her mother, Emma, was the daughter of Saïd ben Mohamed, of Kabyle origin, born in Mogador, Morocco, and Margherita (or Marguerite) Bracco, who was born in Murazzano, Piedmont, Italy.

Career

Marsa was a singer, circus performer and equestrian. Her stage name, Line Marsa, was inspired by La Marsa, a port in Tunisia, according to her son Herbert. Although said to have a voice similar to that of Piaf, she had no success as a singer.

Personal life
On 4 September 1914, she married Louis Alphonse Gassion, a singer and circus contortionist. The following year, on December 19, she gave birth to their first child, Édith Giovanna, who would become Édith Piaf. On 31 August 1918, she gave birth to their second child, Herbert. Édith was raised by Annetta's mother, Emma, from 1915 to 1918, when she was sent to Louis Gassion's mother instead due to Annetta and Emma's neglect.

Annetta and Louis were divorced on 4 June 1929 reportedly because of her substance abuse. She never remarried.

Death

Line Marsa died of a drug overdose in Paris on 6 February 1945. She is not buried with her Piaf at Père Lachaise Cemetery, unlike Louis-Alphonse Gassion.

In popular culture

Marsa was portrayed by Clotilde Courau in Olivier Dahan's 2007 Piaf biopic, La vie en rose.
In 2021 the Comitato Unesco Jazz day Livorno (Unesco Jazz Day Committee of the city of LIvorno, a volunteer no profit organization founded 2012 by the musician, Andrea Pellegrini) declared 4 August "Giornata degli artisti di strada" (street artists day) to remember Line Marsa. The livornese graffiti artist Mart made a painting on the wall pf the public park Villa Fabbricotti and a stone plate: "Line Marsa / (Anita Maillard) / nacque a Livorno / 4 agosto 1805".

References

1895 births
1945 deaths
People from Livorno
French people of Kabyle descent
French expatriates in Italy
20th-century French women singers
Édith Piaf
Drug-related deaths in France
French circus performers